Jovan Vlalukin (born 21 May 1999) is a Serbian professional footballer who plays as a full-back for RFS.

References

External links
 
 
 

1999 births
Living people
Footballers from Novi Sad
Association football forwards
Serbian footballers
Serbian First League players
Serbian SuperLiga players
Latvian Higher League players
FK Teleoptik players
FK Metalac Gornji Milanovac players
FK RFS players
Serbian expatriate footballers
Serbia youth international footballers
Serbia under-21 international footballers
Serbia international footballers
Expatriate footballers in Latvia
Serbian expatriate sportspeople in Latvia